Freaky Friday is a comedic children's novel written by Mary Rodgers, first published by Harper & Row in 1972. It has been adapted for several films, including versions in 1976, 1995, 2003, and 2018, and was reinterpreted as a horror film for Freaky (2020).

The story features one day, that 13-year-old Annabel Andrews and her mother spent in each other's bodies. Thus it may be considered a modern retelling of Vice Versa: A Lesson to Fathers, the 1882 novel by F. Anstey in which the protagonists are a father and son, though in the Mary Rodgers version the lesson is to daughters and mothers.

Plot
A willful, disorganized teenage girl, Annabel Andrews, awakens one Friday morning to find herself in the body of her mother, with whom she had argued the previous night.

Suddenly in charge of taking care of the New York family's affairs and her younger brother Ben (whom Annabel has not-so-affectionately nicknamed "Ape Face" and described as "so neat, it's revolting!"), and growing increasingly worried about the disappearance of "Annabel", who appeared to be herself in the morning but has gone missing after leaving the Andrews' home, she enlists the help of her neighbor and childhood friend, Boris, though without telling him about her identity crisis.

As the day wears on and Annabel has a series of increasingly bizarre and frustrating adventures, she becomes gradually more appreciative of how difficult her mother's life is, and learns, to her surprise, that Ben idolizes her, and Boris is actually named Morris, but has a problem with chronic congestion (at least around Annabel) leading him to nasally pronounce ms and ns as bs and ds. The novel races towards its climax and Ben also disappears, apparently having gone off with a pretty girl whom Boris did not recognize, but Ben appeared to trust without hesitation.

In the climax and dénouement, Annabel becomes overwhelmed by the difficulties of her situation, apparent disappearance of her mother, loss of the children, and the question of how her odd situation came about and when/whether it will be resolved. Finally, it is revealed that Annabel's mother herself caused them to switch bodies through some unspecified means, and the mysterious teen beauty who took Ben was Mrs. Andrews in Annabel's body (to which she is restored) made much more attractive by a makeover Mrs. Andrews gave the body while using it, including the removal of Annabel's braces, an appointment Annabel had forgotten about (and would have missed, had she been the one in her body that day).

Characters

Annabel Andrews
Disorganized (perhaps even slovenly), rebellious, and something of a tomboy, 13-year-old Annabel is a fairly typical teen who believes that adults have it easy and quickly finds herself out of her depth when faced with real adult responsibilities and concerns. She wants to be free because of her mother bossing her around and is really serious about doing some things she wants to do, but she can not because of her mother.
Ben Andrews, a.k.a. Ape Face
A typical pre-adolescent younger sibling, 6-year-old Ben delights in creating conflict with Annabel, which has led to her nicknaming him Ape Face. Unknown to Annabel, he and his friends think she is the epitome of cool, and he wears the nickname as a badge of honor. The truth comes out when she slips up and calls him Ape Face while her mind is in Mrs. Andrews' body. After she apologizes, he admits that he likes the namebut desperately wants to keep this secret from Annabel.
Morris/Boris
A childhood friend of Annabel, he has been somewhat afraid of her since a sandbox incident in which she cut his head open with a shovel. Deciding she played too rough, he and his mother have made a point of him avoiding Annabel since. He is a cheerful, charming and handsome young gentleman, and does his best to help "Mrs. Andrews" (really Annabel) as she struggles through a tough day. He has some occasional breathing trouble, attributed to his adenoids and possibly a psychosomatic reaction to his own mother, which renders his voice nasal, making him unable to pronounce the letters m and n clearly. Because of this, Annabel has always believed his name to be Boris, when it is in fact Morris. However, she suffers the exact opposite misunderstanding when he offers to prepare a "beetloaf" for a dinner party with the limited assortment of culinary ingredients available, and she believes he is going to save dinner by providing a much more sensible meatloaf, but she is won over when she samples the new dish and finds it tasty.
Ellen Jean Benjamin Andrews
Despite setting the events in motion and later ending them deus ex machina-style, Mrs. Andrews remains (along with Annabel's body, which she has taken) an unseen character for much of the book, only revealing herself and what she has done at the end of the day.

Sequels
Mary Rodgers wrote two sequels featuring the Andrews family. In A Billion for Boris (October 1974), Annabel and her friend Morris/Boris discover a TV set that tunes into future broadcasts and begin betting on horse races. In Summer Switch (September 1982), Annabel's little brother Ben and their father Bill inadvertently switch bodies as both are leaving for the summer, leaving the boy to negotiate Hollywood and Dad to attend summer camp. Thus Summer Switch, too, may be considered a modern retelling of Vice Versa.

All three Andrews family novels were soon published in Harper Trophy trade paperback editions. In later HarperTrophy editions, the second story has been titled ESP TV (1999) and A Billion for Boris: Also known as ESP TV (2003),  .

A thematic sequel by Rodgers and Heather Hach was published by The Bowen Press, HarperCollins, in May 2009: Freaky Monday, in which 13-year-old schoolgirl Hadley and a teacher she dislikes "switch bodies". Hach and Leslie Dixon wrote the 2003 screenplay for Disney's third film adaptation.

Film adaptations
 
Freaky Friday has been adapted many times into films with similar plots:
 Disney adapted the story into a 1976 film with a screenplay written by Rodgers. The film stars Barbara Harris and Jodie Foster as Ellen and Annabel.
 Disney's second adaptation premiered in 1995; this film stars Shelley Long and Gaby Hoffmann as Ellen and Annabel Andrews, switched by magical amulets responding to their wish to have each other's lives.
 Freaky Friday (2003), written by Heather Hach and Leslie Dixon, has the protagonists' names changed to Tess Coleman (Jamie Lee Curtis) and Anna Coleman (Lindsay Lohan). They are switched by magical fortune cookies given to them by a meddling old Chinese woman on Thursday night after she overhears them arguing at her daughter's restaurant. Even after being returned to normal, the daughter is fortunately able to prevent her mother from meddling by knocking over the cookies.
 Disney Channel and Disney Theatrical Productions produced another television film, adapting the musical of the same name, which premiered in August 2018; Heidi Blickenstaff reprises her role as the mother, while Cozi Zuehlsdorff portrays her daughter. The protagonists' names were changed to Katherine and Ellie Blake, respectively.
 Freaky (2020), directed by Christopher Landon from a screenplay by Landon and Michael Kennedy, reinterprets Freaky Fridays basic plot as a comedy slasher film; Freaky stars Vince Vaughn and Kathryn Newton as an infamous serial killer and a tormented high school student, respectively, who switch bodies after the former stabs her with an ancient dagger. The film's working title was Freaky Friday the 13th.

Additionally, a television film of the sequel novel Summer Switch, starring Robert Klein and Scott Schwartz, was made in 1984 as part of the ABC Afterschool Special series. A film of the first sequel called Billions for Boris starring Mary Tanner as Annabel, Scott Tiler as Boris, and Seth Green as Ape Face was released in 1984.

A major difference between the novel and the films is the presence of an outside influence switching the often-bickering mother and daughter against both their wills. Because of this, both serve as protagonists, and the films start shortly before the switch, illustrating the conflict between the two, then follow the trouble both have adjusting to their new circumstances, and the new respect and understanding they both come to have for each other before switching back. Mary Rodgers also added a hobby for Annabel to the story, with an important competition, for which her mother lacks the skill, serving to bring the action to a climax. This addition was kept in subsequent versions, although the original hobby of waterskiing changed to other events, and an important simultaneous event for the mother (her wedding rehearsal dinner) was added to the 2003 film. The latter two also drastically change the character of Morris/Boris. In both films, his name is changed (Luke in the 1995 film, Jake in the 2003 film), and he is already Annabel's love interest, rather than being an enemy of hers. Like the 1976 film, both of the updated versions of the characters fall in love with Annabel's mother (due to Annabel flirting with him while in her mother's body). Marc McClure, who played Boris in the 1976 film, also has a cameo as a delivery man (who is also named Boris) in the 2003 film.

Stage and television musical 
A stage musical has been developed by Disney Theatrical Productions only for licensing, with the music written by Tom Kitt and lyrics written by Brian Yorkey and the book by Bridget Carpenter. The musical began performances at the Signature Theatre, Arlington, Virginia on October 4, 2016. Directed by Christopher Ashley, with choreography by Sergio Trujillo, the cast features Emma Hunton (as the daughter Ellie), Jason Gotay and Heidi Blickenstaff (as the mother Katherine). Ashley explained that the musical is based on the original Rodgers book as well as the films. The musical is set in the present-day Chicago.

The musical began performances at the La Jolla Playhouse, San Diego, on January 31, 2017, and ran to March 12. The cast features Emma Hunton and Heidi Blickenstaff. This was followed by runs at Cleveland Play House in April and the Alley Theatre in June.

A Disney Channel film adaptation of the stage musical premiered in the summer of 2018. Blickenstaff reprised her role as the mother, Katherine, while Cozi Zuehlsdorff starred as the daughter, Ellie. Carpenter returned to adapt the musical as a teleplay, while Kitt and Yorkey returned to oversee the music and lyrics. The TV adaptation was produced by Susan Cartsonis and Thomas Schumacher.

References

External links 
 

 
1972 American novels
1972 fantasy novels
American children's novels
Children's fantasy novels
American fantasy novels adapted into films
Fiction about body swapping
1972 children's books
American novels adapted into television shows